Kinaldie railway station was a railway station in Kinaldie, Aberdeenshire.

History
The station was closed as part of the Beeching cuts on 7 December 1964.

Historic services

Notes

References
 
 

Disused railway stations in Aberdeenshire
Beeching closures in Scotland
Former Great North of Scotland Railway stations
Railway stations in Great Britain opened in 1854
Railway stations in Great Britain closed in 1964
1854 establishments in Scotland
1964 disestablishments in Scotland